Senator Laning may refer to:

Albert P. Laning (1817–1880), New York State Senate
J. Ford Laning (1853–1941), Ohio State Senate